Miracles Do Happen is a 1938 British comedy film directed by Maclean Rogers and starring Jack Hobbs, Bruce Seton and Marjorie Taylor. It was made at Isleworth Studios as a quota quickie.

Cast
 Jack Hobbs as Barry Strangeways 
 Bruce Seton as Rodney Gilmore  
 Marjorie Taylor as Peggy Manning  
 Aubrey Mallalieu as Prof. Gilmore  
 George Carney as Mr. F. Greenlaw  
 Molly Hamley-Clifford as Mrs. Greenlaw  
 Anthony Holles as Proctor  
 Douglas Stewart
 Derek Farr as Greenlaw's Secretary 
 Andreas Malandrinos as Headwaiter  
 Michael Ripper as Morning Comet Reporter

References

Bibliography
 Low, Rachael. Filmmaking in 1930s Britain. George Allen & Unwin, 1985.
 Wood, Linda. British Films, 1927-1939. British Film Institute, 1986.

External links

1938 films
British comedy films
1938 comedy films
Films shot at Isleworth Studios
Films directed by Maclean Rogers
Quota quickies
British black-and-white films
1930s English-language films
1930s British films